Apollon Shinkuba is a retired politician from Abkhazia and the current Chairman of the Council of Elders of Abkhazia.

Early life and career 
Apollon Shinkuba was born on 7 April 1946 in the village of Tkhin, Ochamchira District. He graduated from the philological faculty of the Sukhumi Pedagogical Institute in 1975. Between 1994 and 1997, Shinkuba served as deputy Chief of Staff of the Abkhazian Military. Between 2000 and 2001, he was Chairman of the State Committee for Repatriation. Shinkuba retired from the army in 2007 with the rank of Colonel.

Chairman of the Council of Elders
Shinkuba was unanimously elected Chairman of the Council of Elders on 15 July 2016, following the death in March of his predecessor Konstantin Ozgan.

References

1946 births
living people
People from Ochamchira District
Chairmen of the State Committee for Repatriation of Abkhazia